"The One That You Love" is a song by British-Australian soft rock duo Air Supply, released as a single from their sixth studio album of the same name. It was written by member Graham Russell. The song reached No. 1 in the United States, topping the Billboard Hot 100 chart on 25 July 1981 and remaining there for one week; it is the duo's only No. 1 hit. The song's lead vocals are sung by Russell Hitchcock.

"The One That You Love" also peaked at No. 2 for five weeks on the Adult Contemporary chart, behind "I Don't Need You" by Kenny Rogers.

Reception
Cash Box said "Australia's Air Supply leaps back onto the charts with the title track from its forthcoming follow-up LP. A grandoise, string-laden number, with Graham Russell's unmistakable vocals, this recaptures the urgent romanticism of 'Lost in Love' and 'All Out Of Love' with plaintive backup vocals." Record World described it as a "loving ballad that can't miss."

Charts

Weekly charts

Year-end charts

Personnel
Russell Hitchcock - vocals
Graham Russell - vocals, guitar

See also
List of Billboard Hot 100 number-one singles of 1981

References

1981 songs
1981 singles
Air Supply songs
APRA Award winners
Billboard Hot 100 number-one singles
Cashbox number-one singles
Songs written by Graham Russell
Song recordings produced by Harry Maslin
Arista Records singles
1980s ballads